Gerhard Heer (born 19 December 1955) is a German former fencer. He won a gold medal in the team épée event at the 1984 Summer Olympics.

References

External links
 

1955 births
Living people
People from Tauberbischofsheim
Sportspeople from Stuttgart (region)
German male fencers
Olympic fencers of West Germany
Fencers at the 1984 Summer Olympics
Olympic gold medalists for West Germany
Olympic medalists in fencing
Medalists at the 1984 Summer Olympics
20th-century German people
21st-century German people